is an adventure mystery stealth video game developed by Airtight Games and published in 2014 by Square Enix for Microsoft Windows, PlayStation 3, PlayStation 4, Xbox 360 and Xbox One.

The game is played in a third-person view as the player navigates the protagonist, detective Ronan O'Connor, around a fictionalized version of the American town, Salem. The story centers on Ronan as he hunts down an infamous serial murderer stylized 'The Bell Killer'. After being killed by the Bell Killer at the beginning of the game, Ronan returns as a ghost. He is then informed by his long-dead wife, Julia, that he must solve the Bell Killer mystery so he can rejoin her.

Murdered: Soul Suspect received an average reception upon release; most criticisms centered on the poor combat, short length, lack of replay value, and lack of difficulty. The game did, however, receive praise for some aspects of its story and its original concept.

Gameplay

Murdered: Soul Suspect takes place in a fictionalized version of Salem. Played in a third-person view, the player navigates the protagonist, Ronan, around town. There are multiple areas in Salem to explore such as a church, an apartment building, and a graveyard. The player completes levels in order to progress further into the game. There are hundreds of collectibles in the game, including 'Ghost Girl Messages' and various different types of scraps of paper which contain information about Ronan's life. Since the character is a ghost, he has a number of ghostly abilities such as teleportation and possession. Each area has clues to collect to progress through the level and the story; the clues are found in a way similar to L.A. Noires investigation sequences.

Plot
In present-day Salem, a serial killer known as the Bell Killer begins murdering seemingly unconnected victims. Police Detective Ronan O'Connor is able to track down the Bell Killer, but is thrown out of a window and shot to death during a fight. He returns in the form of a ghost, and learns that in order to reach the afterlife and meet his wife Julia, he must first discover the identity of his killer. With the help of Abigail, the ghost of a Puritan child, Ronan is able to use his ghostly abilities to return to the fight scene, and discovers that a medium named Joy witnessed the fight, and is now hiding in a church.

Joy is in search of her missing mother Cassandra, who was consulting with the police on the Bell Killer case, and initially refuses to help Ronan. He travels to the police station where she is being held, helping her escape so as she can help him interact with the physical world and track down his killer. While leading Joy out of the station, Ronan discovers that Baxter, a hostile fellow officer, was the one working with Cassandra. Cassandra's research leads the pair to the Salem graveyard to investigate a possible Bell Killer victim. After pursuing the ghost of the young drowned girl, Sophia, Ronan's ghostly powers allow him to view flashbacks of the murder. Sophia reveals that the Bell Killer asked her about a 'contract'.

A review of Cassandra's research leads the pair to a mental hospital to find the Bell Killer's surviving victim, Iris. Infiltrating the facility, they learn Iris possesses the same ability to see ghosts and realize the Bell Killer is killing psychic mediums. It is revealed that Iris is possessed by the spirit of her sister, Rose, whom the Bell Killer burned alive after she helped Iris escape. Rose, Iris, and Joy return to the church. Meanwhile, Ronan investigates a museum exhibit about the Salem witch hunts. There, he deduces that the Bell Killer is executing his victims as if they are witches; psychic flashbacks reveal that Baxter suspiciously concealed evidence at the museum about the Bell Killer. Believing Baxter is the Bell Killer, Ronan leaves the museum and notices several police cars heading toward the church.

Once there, Ronan learns that the Bell Killer attacked the building, crushing Iris to death, and slaughtering several people who stood in his way. Although Joy is safe, she is re-arrested and taken away by Ronan's brother-in-law Rex, the lead detective on the Bell Killer case. Investigating the church, Ronan realizes that the Bell Killer is hiding in the derelict Judgment House. There, Ronan discovers evidence of the Bell Killer's activities and clues implying that the killings have been occurring for hundreds of years.

Ronan discovers Baxter's corpse. Baxter's ghost reveals he was murdered by the Bell Killer while secretly still investigating the case following his demotion. He also clarifies that he'd been working with Cassandra and she's still alive. In the basement, flashbacks reveal that Abigail had been imprisoned there before she was hanged. Her execution came as punishment for accusing several innocent people of witchcraft, resulting in their deaths. In anger, Abigail drew a bell symbol on the floor, swearing that she will never stop until the bell tolls for all of the witches in Salem. She believed they made a contract with demons to gain inhuman powers.

Following the evidence, Ronan returns to the museum to discover that Rex is the Bell Killer, having been possessed by Abigail. As he prepares to hang Joy, Ronan manages to force Abigail's spirit out of Rex, and the pair battle by inflicting painful memories on each other. These memories reveal that Abigail has possessed many people to carry out the Bell Killer murders before killing the possessed themselves. Among the possessed are Baxter, who she used to kill Rose, and even Ronan himself, who killed Sophia.

Abigail summons a portal of demons to swallow Ronan. He escapes its pull and forces Abigail in. She submerges and the portal fades.

Joy is saved and later reunites with her mother. Rex remains unaware of the crimes committed using his body. In the aftermath, Ronan hears Julia calling him and turns toward her voice.

Development 

The game came about because Square-Enix wished to appeal more towards the Western market. Yosuke Shiokawa, a creative director at Square-Enix, came up with the idea of a game where the player was a ghost and pitched it to the development team at Airtight Games. Airtight then came up with various concepts surrounding the ghost idea, some of which "were almost superhero stories" according to Matt Brunner, Airtight's chief creative officer. In an interview with IGN, Shiokawa noted that he was inspired from watching the movie Die Hard and asking himself "what if John McClane died? What if John McClane was killed? Is he going to give up?"  He reasoned that he wouldn't and that "even as a ghost he's going to try and save the people in Nakatomi Plaza, including his wife." which led to the initial concept of the game.

The team had trouble at first integrating Western and Eastern philosophies regarding ghosts. About the process, Brunner later stated "There are a lot of assumptions that we weren't even aware of, that we were making on both sides, about how to fictionally support who you are as a character in this world. It took us, I would say, a good year and a half of constant back-and-forth to get that sense of, "What, really? Oh, so that's what you're talking about."

Reception

Murdered: Soul Suspect received an average reception upon release; most criticisms centered around the poor combat, short length, lack of replay value, and lack of difficulty. Review aggregator website Metacritic gave the PlayStation 4 version 59/100 based on 60 reviews, the Microsoft Windows version 59/100 based on 22 reviews, and the Xbox One version 51/100 based on 17 reviews.

IGNs Lucy O'Brien gave the game a 5.5 out of 10 calling it "Mediocre" and saying: "There are some great concepts in Murdered: Soul Suspect, but they feel undercooked or underutilised, and the lack of demand for any real input from us makes Murdered feel like a pick-a-path game where there's only one path. It scrapes by on the power of its central whodunnit mystery, but I can't help but feel that Murdered: Soul Suspect is ten hours' worth of unfinished business."

GameSpots Tom McShea was slightly less negative in giving the game a 6 out of 10; he praised certain aspects of the story saying: "Despite [the] issues, at no point was I disenchanted by Soul Suspect. Even though I recognized how ludicrous the game often was, I was still invested in the story that was slowly unfolding." McShea wrapped up the review by saying: "Murdered: Soul Suspect has a lot more spirit than its taciturn protagonist could ever muster."

Andrew Reiner of Game Informer gave the game a 6.5 out of 10; he summed up his review by saying "This is one of those games that I find myself raving about one second, and dragging through the mud the next. Is it worth your time? I think so. Despite its numerous shortcomings, I was entertained to the point of not wanting to put it down. It's a satisfying murder mystery and a sub-par game all rolled in one. The story won out in the end for me. If you can tolerate the shoddy investigation gameplay, there's plenty of fun (and wrong guessing) to be had."

References
Notes

Citations

External links

 

2014 video games
Action-adventure games
Detective video games
Video games about ghosts
PlayStation 3 games
PlayStation 4 games
Square Enix games
Stealth video games
Unreal Engine games
Video games developed in the United States
Windows games
Xbox 360 games
Xbox One games
Video games set in 2014
Video games about spirit possession
Video games about demons
Fiction about murder
Video games about police officers
Video games about psychic powers
Teen fiction
Video games scored by Jason Graves
Video games set in Massachusetts
Video games about witchcraft
Fiction set in the 15th century
Airtight Games games